Frégate Island Airport  is an airstrip serving Frégate Island in the Seychelles. The runway is along the northeast shore of the island.

See also

Transport in Seychelles
List of airports in Seychelles

References

External links
OpenStreetMap - Frégate
OurAirports - Frégate
FallingRain - Frégate Airport

Airports in Seychelles